Eesti Miss Estonia is a national beauty pageant in Estonia.

History
The first Miss Estonia was elected in April 1923, her name was Sinaida Tamm. The competition was arranged by "Estonia Film" and the main aim was to find a new actress. In 1925 the competition was arranged by a major newspaper "Päevaleht". In 1931, Lilli Silberg was the first runner up at the Miss Europe contest in Paris. In 1932, Nadezda Peedi-Hoffmann was elected Miss Estonia and she held the title for 56 years, until 1988, when Heli Mets was awarded the title. Since then Estonia has had 15 beauty queens. Miss Estonia has been participating in the Miss Universe pageant since 1993, starting with Kersti Tänavsuu.

Cancellation
In 2019, the Eesti Miss beauty pageant was cancelled due to the lack of supporters for the annual project.

Mister Estonia
Valeri Kirss also produced the annual Mister Estonia (Mister Eesti) under Eesti Miss Estonia but the pageant does not exist since 2009. Here mentioned the recent winners:
2008 — Kaido Matson
2006 — Villu Loonde

Titleholders

Big Four pageants representatives

Miss Universe Estonia

The winner of Eesti Miss Estonia represents the country at the Miss Universe pageant. On occasion, when the winner does not qualify (due to age) a runner-up is sent.

See also
 Miss Baltic Sea
 Miss Europe

Notes
 In 1993, Kersti Tänavsuu (Miss Estonia 1993 First runner up) became the first Estonian representative in the Miss Universe pageant.
 Other times that the first runner up replaced the original winner in Miss Universe competition are Mari Loorens (1998), Katrin Susi (2003) and Julia Kovaljova (2008). 
 In 2005, Jana Kuvaitseva didn't compete in Miss Universe 2005 due to personal reasons but none of her runners up was sent to Thailand.
 The pageant produces 4 Miss Baltic Sea winners: Liis Tappo (1992), Eva Maria Laan (1995), Kadri Väljaots (1999) and Dagmar Makko (2001).

References

Miss Universe by country
Beauty pageants in Estonia
Recurring events established in 1923
1923 establishments in Estonia
Estonian awards